The 1998–99 St. Louis Blues season was the team's 32nd season in the National Hockey League (NHL). Despite the loss of Brett Hull during the preceding off-season, the Blues made the Stanley Cup playoffs for the 20th-straight season after finishing in second place with a record of 37–32–13.

Off-season
Realignment came, as the NHL went from four to six divisions. Carolina, Florida, Tampa Bay and Washington were grouped in the Eastern Conference's new Southeast Division and Calgary, Colorado, Edmonton and Vancouver moved into the new Northwest Division in the Western Conference.

Regular season
The Blues made the playoffs for the 20th straight season by finishing in 2nd place with a record of 37–32–13. Al MacInnis won the Norris trophy as the best defenceman in the NHL, while Pavol Demitra scored 37 goals. In the playoffs, the Blues initially trailed the Phoenix Coyotes 3 games to 1. The Blues rallied and took the series in 7 games. However, in the second round, the Blues were knocked off again by the Dallas Stars led by Brett Hull in 6 games. Hull would go on to score the Stanley Cup clinching goal for the Stars.

The Blues tied the Washington Capitals for the fewest power-play opportunities during the regular season, with just 301. They also tied the Dallas Stars and San Jose Sharks for the fewest short-handed goals allowed, with 4.

Season standings

Schedule and results

Playoffs

Player statistics

Regular season
Scoring

Goaltending

Playoffs
Scoring

Goaltending

Awards and records
 James Norris Memorial Trophy – Al MacInnis, St. Louis Blues

All-Star teams
 First team – Al MacInnis, St. Louis Blues

Transactions

Draft picks
St. Louis's draft picks at the 1998 NHL Entry Draft held at the Marine Midland Arena in Buffalo, New York.

See also
 1998–99 NHL season

References
Bibliography
 
 Blues on Hockey Database
 St. Louis Blues Website

S
S
St. Louis Blues seasons
St
St